Zhang Hong Jie (1979–2004), also known as Steffi Zhang was a female 25-year-old Chinese University of Canberra communications student found murdered in her flat in Belconnen, Australia, in January 2005.

Crime and disappearance
The killing caused an uproar, because the body was not discovered for seven months after the murder, which was said to have happened in June 2004. Police identified a suspect in the killing, her boyfriend at the time: Zhang Long from the city of Dalian. He flew to Shanghai, China shortly after the incident, where he was being held . No charge is being laid and China has not agreed to extradite him, although asked to by the Australian government.

After the killing, the University of Canberra introduced changes to their policy for international students and management.

The Federal Government of Australia wants the Australian Capital Territory (ACT includes Canberra) to cooperate with the Chinese investigation into the murder, as written by a letter from John Howard to Chief Minister Stanhope in May 2005, and another request from Justice Minister Chris Ellison in June. The ACT government does not want to because it may mean Zhang would face a firing squad in China if convicted.

Investigation
On 27 February 2005 a warrant was issued in the ACT Magistrates court for Zhang's arrest. He has not been charged with her murder.

Aftermath
The ACT Liberal opposition wants the Chief Minister to use his Chinese contacts to bring Zhang to 'justice'.

See also
Amanda Zhao, similar case in Canada
List of solved missing person cases
List of unsolved murders
Murder of Shao Tong, similar case in U.S.
Trial of Xiao Zhen, similar case in New Zealand

References

External links 
Press Conference AFP

2000s missing person cases
Chinese people murdered abroad
Chinese murder victims
Deaths by person in Australia
Female murder victims
Missing person cases in Australia
Unsolved murders in Australia